Ynysddu Rugby Football Club is a rugby union team from the village of Ynysddu in Wales. The club is a member of the Welsh Rugby Union and is a feeder club for the Newport Gwent Dragons.

Ynysddu RFC's first recorded match was against Abercarn in 1884 and was played on the church field at Mynyddislwyn. The club originally played in an all black strip until the 1920s when they switched to a red and black hooped kit.

References

External links
 Ynysddu RFC

Rugby clubs established in 1894
Welsh rugby union teams
1894 establishments in Wales